Skikda Airport was an airport in Algeria , located approximately 5 km east of Skikda; about 60 km north-northeast of Constantine.

The  asphalt runway was closed sometime prior to 2004. The area is overbuilt and used as a storage for construction materials.

World War II
During World War II, the facility was known as "Philippeville Airfield".  It was a major Twelfth Air Force base of operations during the North African Campaign against the German Afrika Korps.  The 310th Bombardment Group flew B-25 Mitchells from the airfield between  10 November-10 December 1943.

See also

Transport in Algeria
List of airports in Algeria

References

 Maurer, Maurer. Air Force Combat Units of World War II. Maxwell AFB, Alabama: Office of Air Force History, 1983. .
 
 USAFHRA search for Philippeville Airfield
 Google Earth Historical Imagery

External links

Airports in Algeria
Airfields of the United States Army Air Forces in Algeria
World War II airfields in Algeria
Buildings and structures in Skikda Province